Paul Personne (born 27 December 1949) is a French blues singer and guitarist.

Discography

Studio albums
 Paul Personne (1982, Epic)
 Exclusif (1983, Philips)
 Barjoland (1984, Philips)
 24/24 (1985, Philips)
 La Chance (1989, Bird)
 Comme À La Maison (1992, Polydor)
 Rêve Sidéral D'Un Naïf Idéal (1994, Polydor)
 Instantanés (1996, Polydor)
 Patchwork Électrique (2000, Polydor)
 Demain Il F'ra Beau (2003, Polydor)
 Coup D'Blues (2003, Polydor)
 Amicalement blues (with Hubert-Félix Thiéfaine) (2007, RCA)
 Personne À L'Ouest, face A (2011)
 Personne À L'Ouest, face B (2011)
 Puzzle 14 (2014)
 Electric rendez-vous (2015)
 Lost in Paris Blues Band (2016)
 Funambule (Ou Tentative De Survie En Milieu Hostile)  (2019)

Live albums
 La Route De La Chance (1990, Bird)
 Route 97 (1997, Polydor)
 Il était une fois la route (2006, XIII Bis Records)

Live DVDs
 Il était une Fois la route (2006, XIII Bis Records)
 Un 24 juillet aux vieilles charrues (2004, Polydor)

Compilation albums
 The Best Of (2005, Polydor Canada) 1983–2005

Box set
 Anthologie 1983–1997 (1997, Polydor)

References

External links

Official website

1949 births
Living people
People from Argenteuil
French male singers
French blues guitarists
French male guitarists